Usk station is on the Canadian National Railway mainline in Usk, British Columbia, on the north side of Skeena river, across the river, by barge ferry or cable car from Highway 16. The station is served by Via Rail's Jasper – Prince Rupert train as a flag stop.

Footnotes

External links 
Via Rail Station Description

Via Rail stations in British Columbia